St. Francis or Saint Francis may refer to:

Roman Catholic saints
Francis of Assisi (1181–1226), Italian founder of the Order of Friars Minor (Franciscans)
Francis of Paola (1416–1507), Italian (Calabrian) founder of the Order of the Minims
Francis Xavier (1506–1552), Navarrese Catholic missionary to India; co-founder of the Society of Jesus (Jesuits)
Francis Borgia (1510–1572), Spanish Jesuit priest; third leader of the Jesuits
Francis Solanus (1549–1610), Spanish Franciscan missionary to South America
Francis Caracciolo (1563–1608), Italian priest who co-founded the Congregation of the Minor Clerics Regular
Francis de Sales (1567–1622), French born bishop of Geneva, Switzerland
Francis Ferdinand de Capillas (1607–1648), Castilian Dominican missionary; first Roman Catholic martyr killed in China
Francis de Geronimo (1642–1716), Italian Jesuit priest
Francis Marto (1908–1919), Portuguese Marian child visionary

Places

Australia
St Francis Island, an island in South Australia

Canada
St. Francis, Alberta
Saint-François Parish, New Brunswick, formerly named St. Francis Parish
Saint-François-de-Madawaska, New Brunswick, formerly named St. Francis
St. Francis Harbour, Nova Scotia

South Africa
St Francis Bay,  a village in Cacadu District Municipality, Eastern Cape province
Cape St. Francis, a town in Eastern Cape province

United States
St. Francis, Arkansas
St. Francis, Florida, a ghost town in Florida
St. Francis, Kansas
Saint Francis, Kentucky
St. Francis, Maine
St. Francis, Minnesota, Anoka County
St. Francis, Stearns County, Minnesota
St. Francis, South Dakota, a town on the Rosebud Indian Reservation in Todd County
St. Francis, Texas
St. Francis, Wisconsin
St. Francis River, a river in Missouri and Arkansas

Schools
St. Francis College, a college in Brooklyn Heights, New York
St. Francis Brooklyn Terriers, the school's athletic program
St. Francis' College, a college in Lucknow, India
Saint Francis University, a university in Loretto, Pennsylvania
Saint Francis Red Flash, the school's athletic program
St. Francis Xavier University, a university in Antigonish, Nova Scotia, Canada
University of St. Francis, a university with locations throughout the United States
University of Saint Francis (disambiguation), various universities
Saint Francis High School (disambiguation), various high schools
St. Francis' Canossian College, a secondary school in Hong Kong
St. Francis' Canossian School, a primary school in Hong Kong
St. Francis Xavier's College, a secondary boys' school in Hong Kong.

Other uses
St. Francis (film), a 2002 film starring Raoul Bove
HMCS St. Francis, a Royal Canadian Navy destroyer during World War II
St. Francis (fireboat), operated by the San Francisco Fire Department
St. Francis Yacht Club, a sailing club in San Francisco since 2016
St Francis F.C., a football club in Ireland
Nobilissima Visione, a 1938 ballet by Paul Hindemith, known at its New York performance as Saint Francis
Convent of Saint Francis (Vitoria-Gasteiz), a former convent in Basque Country, Spain
Feast of Saint Francis, a religious and civil celebration annually held in Italy and other locations
OSF Saint Francis Medical Center, a level I trauma center and teaching hospital in Peoria, Illinois

See also
St. Frances (disambiguation)
List of places named after Saint Francis
San Francisco, a city and county in California
St. Francis Hospital (disambiguation)
St. Francis in Ecstasy (disambiguation)
Saint-François (disambiguation)
Francis (disambiguation)
San Francisco (disambiguation)
San Francisco Cathedral (disambiguation)
São Francisco (disambiguation)